Carl Philip Friedemann Maximilian Müller, more commonly known as Max Müller (22 October 1808–28 October 1884) was a Danish officer who served in the First and Second Schleswig Wars.

Early military career
Max was born as the son of Christian Vilhelm Carl Müller, who was a captain in the Funen Infantry Regiment. He died in 1820 when his son was 12. His mother, Helene F. Strickenbach, was from Egernførde and later moved with her five children, of whom Max was the eldest, to Rendsborg. In 1822, Müller joined the Royal Danish Military Academy and in 1825, after passing the officer's degree, became second lieutenant in the 
Holstein Infantry Regiment, where he did not serve until New Year's Day 1827, as he was previously first corporal in the Cadet Corps and royal page. The regiment, which in 1842 was renamed the 15th Battalion, was stationed in Rendsburg, and he remained there both as a first lieutenant in 1834 and as a characterized captain in 1841. Müller read a lot, and hardened his body by long walks and all kinds of weapons exercises. It was reported that if someone stepped too close to him or spoke ill of his country, he would not understand the joke, but instead gave the recipient the choice between a duel, or apologizing.

First Schleswig War
In 1846, Müller became a captain 2nd class and was transferred to Copenhagen as company commander of the 4th Battalion, with which he also went to the field in 1848. It did not take long before he earned a name as one of the army's most capable officers, leading his company with distinction at Bov, Schleswig, Nybøl and Dybbøl. He was stationed at Sundeved in April 1849 and later fought at Isted. In 1849, he was employed by Krabbes brigade. In the Battle at Vedelspang, he was the head of two companies that recaptured the Katbæk Forest from insurgents with a bayonet charge that caused his opponents to flee. Ever after that day, he retained a great love for the bayonet and had the troops under him practise bayonet attacks. He became a Knight of Dannebrog in 1848.

After the war, Müller joined the 1st Reinforcement Battalion and several divisions and in 1852 the 13th Battalion, and became a major in 1853. but received the command of the 1st Battalion in Rendsburg the following year, and also became a lieutenant colonel in 1857. He spent nine years there and hardened his Copenhageners by strenuous exercises. His name was therefore already widely known in the 1850s, when he in his study of tactics was one of those who first had an eye for the advantages of the company column, to whose introduction he contributed significantly. In 1858, he became a Knight of Dannebrog.

Second Schleswig War

When the army was mobilized in the autumn of 1863, it was initially provided that Müller would command the 1st Regiment.  Instead, he was appointed colonel and commander of the 7th Brigade, consisting of the 1st and 11th Regiments. The brigade came up to Dannevirke, and two of its battalions took part in the battle at Selk and Königshügel on February 3. When the army withdrew from Dannevirke on the 5th, he became commander of the 3rd Division under general Peter Frederik Steinmann, consisting of the 7th and 8th Brigades, to cover the retreat, and these then took turns to be closest to the Prussians and Austrians. At the Sankelmark, Müller was ordered to take up position with his brigade to let the 8th Brigade go through and to stop the pursuing Austrians. Thus arose the Battle of Sankelmark, in which Müller displayed his best military qualities. "It is not enough that I await the enemy, I must attack him myself," he had stated upon receiving the order to take up a post, and he led both the 1st Regiment, which was at the forefront, and then the 11th Regiment. Denmark lost a total of 17 officers, 28 non-commissioned officers and 783 men, of whom 568 were captured. The Austrian losses amounted to 30 officers and 403 men.

Later, the brigade accompanied General Cai Hegermann-Lindencrone's division north and then fought at Vejle, but then he did not engage in battle again. During the armistice after the defeat at Dybbøl, Müller became head of a newly formed brigade, the landing brigade, which was stationed on Funen.

Postwar life
After the war, in which he was honoured with the Commander's Cross of 1st Dannebrog in 1864, Müller continued as brigade commander of the 2nd Infantry Brigade, and became a member of the Defense Commission in 1866. However he gained no influence, as he understood far better how to command than to negotiate. In implementing the Army Act of 1867, he was appointed general and commander of the 1st Zealand Brigade, and in this position, he ruled with an iron fist and without ever sparing himself to develop the fighting skills of his troops. In 1870 he was head of the Camp Division at Hald and in 1875, was honoured with the Grand Cross of Dannebrog, while in 1879 due to age he was dismissed from the military service.  However, he knew his limitations, should follow from what he wrote in the Journal of War Administration of 1865:

He died on 28 October 1884 in Frederiksberg and was buried at the Frederiksberg Ældre Kirkegård. His wife was Emilie f. Thorsen, daughter of merchant Gottborg Thorsen in Flensburg, whom he had married 11 September 1852.

Legacy
 
There was also a lithograph and woodcut in 1868 and 1879 and was portrayed in the stone engraving titled Fædrelandsslykke in 1886.

In the TV series 1864, Müller is portrayed by Rasmus Bjerg.

References

Bibliography
 
 

1808 births
1884 deaths
19th-century Danish military personnel
People of the First Schleswig War
Danish military personnel of the Second Schleswig War
Knights of the Order of the Dannebrog
Commanders of the Order of the Dannebrog
Grand Crosses of the Order of the Dannebrog